Escape to Athena is a 1979 British adventure comedy war film directed by George P. Cosmatos. It stars Roger Moore, Telly Savalas, David Niven, Stefanie Powers, Claudia Cardinale, Richard Roundtree, Sonny Bono and Elliott Gould. The film is set during the Second World War on a German-occupied Greek island. The music was composed by Lalo Schifrin. It was filmed on location on the island of Rhodes.

Plot 
In 1944, Allied prisoners at a POW camp on an unnamed Greek island are forced to excavate ancient artifacts. The camp Commandant, Major Otto Hecht, a former Austrian antiques dealer, is sending some of the valuable pieces to his sister living in Switzerland. However the prisoners have discovered that they will be sent to other camps once the finds run out, so they arrange to keep "discovering" the same pieces. While Hecht is content to sit out the war, the SS Commandant of the nearby town, Major Volkmann, brutally enforces discipline, including reprisal executions of civilians.

Resistance to the Germans is led by Zeno, a former monk, and his few fighters. They use the local brothel, run by his girlfriend, as an undercover headquarters. Zeno, who is in contact with Allied Headquarters, is ordered to break the prisoners out of their camp and use them to help liberate the town and capture the nearby U-boat refuelling depot.

Two captured USO artists, Charlie and Dottie, perform a concert as cover, while the Resistance takes over the camp. With the choice of being killed by Zeno or helping them, Hecht joins forces with the Allies, helping them eradicate Volkmann's troops as well as capturing the fuel depot. After completing the mission, Charlie asks Zeno to lead him and two other prisoners, Judson and Rotelli, up to the monastery on Mount Athena to steal Byzantine treasures kept there by the monks. However Zeno tells Charlie that the treasures belong to the Greek people.

Zeno now receives word from Allied intelligence that the planned invasion of the islands has been brought forward, and so the German garrison in the monastery atop Mount Athena must be neutralised. Without revealing the whole truth, Zeno tells Charlie, Rotelli and Judson that in return for helping liberate the monks from the Germans, whatever they find there would be theirs.

However, on climbing to the monastery, the group discover a heavily armed garrison. Zeno uses gas to knock out most of the soldiers, but not before their commander orders a V-2 rocket launch to destroy the invasion fleet. Judson knocks out the control room with grenades, but one of the Germans survives long enough to activate the base's self-destruct mechanism. Not realising the danger immediately, Charlie and Rotelli scour the monastery for the treasure, while Judson frees the monks. Zeno finds the self-destruct clock, but he cannot deactivate it. Zeno, the monks and the Americans escape the monastery before it explodes. Searching for treasure until the last minute, Charlie escapes the explosion with the only treasure the Germans left behind — tin plates adorned with Hitler's face.

During the victory celebration in the village, Hecht, Charlie, and Dottie plan after the war to capitalise on treasures Hecht has already looted, by making copies to sell to Americans. Professor Blake learns from one of the freed monks that their treasure — Byzantine plates made of gold — is safe, having been hidden in the brothel the entire time.

The final scene cuts to the modern day, by which time Zeno's former headquarters have been turned into a state museum housing the treasures of Mount Athena.

Cast
 Roger Moore as Major Otto Hecht: an Austrian who is the Wehrmacht commandant of the POW camp, a former antiques dealer
 Telly Savalas as Zeno: the head of the Greek island's resistance movement
 David Niven as Professor Blake: senior British officer amongst the prisoners and a well-known archaeologist
 Stefanie Powers as Dottie Del Mar: an American USO artist (in fact, stripper), who was shot down with Charlie and detained in the POW camp
 Elliott Gould as Charlie Dane: an American comedian, USO performer and professional partner of Dottie
 Claudia Cardinale as Eleana: a local madame, girlfriend of Zeno
 Richard Roundtree as Sgt. Nat Judson: African-American POW and amateur magician
 Sonny Bono as Bruno Rotelli: an Italian POW, professional chef
 Anthony Valentine as Maj. Volkmann: SS officer, town commandant and Hecht's rival
 Siegfried Rauch as Lt. Braun: SS officer under Volkmann's command
 Richard Wren as Capt. Reistoffer: Volkmann's adjutant
 Michael Sheard as Sgt. Mann: Hecht's senior camp NCO
 Philip Locke as Colonel Vogel
 Steve Ubels as Capt. Lantz
 Paul Picerni as Zeno's Man
 Paul Stassino as Zeno's Man
William Holden makes an uncredited cameo as an American sergeant, commenting that he has not escaped as he has a comfortable life as a prisoner.

Production
The film was based on a script by Dick Lochte who was a former Playboy PR executive.

The film was financed by Lew Grade's ITC Entertainment, who had previously made The Eagle Has Landed. That was produced by the team of David Niven Jr and Jack Wiener, and had been successful, so ITC agreed to finance two more films from the same team, Escape to Athena and Green Ice. Grade gave the job of directing to George Costmatos who had just made The Cassandra Crossing for ITC and who Grade felt "would make a great action movie and as "action" was in vogue again I was confident we were on to a winner."

In October 1977 ITC announced what was then known as The Athena Boodle as part of a $97 million slate of movies Lew Grade was making which also included The Legend of the Lone Ranger, Movie Movie (then called Double Feature), The Boys from Brazil, Raise the Titanic, The Golden Gate from the Alistair MacLean novel (never made), Love and Bullets, The Muppet Movie and Road to the Fountain of Youth with Bing Crosby and Bob Hope (which was never made). Grade's first five films had been made in partnership with General Cinema Corp, but Grade would finance this slate himself. The film was also known as The Athena Crisis.

Filming began in Greece on 21 February 1978. The bulk of the film was shot on the island of Rhodes.

David Niven agreed to be in the film because his son produced it and he liked the idea of returning to Rhodes, where he had made The Guns of Navarone.

William Holden was visiting his girlfriend Stefanie Powers during filming and was persuaded to make a cameo in the prison camp scene, presumably reprising his role as Stalag 17 escapee Sergeant Sefton.

According to stuntman Vic Armstrong, the crew hated the director so much they stole his hat and nailed it to a mast. Armstrong directed the motorcycle chase which he says took two weeks.

Reception
Producer Jack Wiener said during the shoot that the film cost $10 million and needed to make $30 million at the box office to recoup its cost.

The film was partly financed and produced by Lew Grade's ITC Entertainment. Grade had wanted an action film and felt it "did not live up to expectations of the script" turning out to be "a broad comedy with action-adventure sequences and the combination just didn't work." Grade thought ""the first eighty minutes were a failure because of these different elements but the last forty, action-packed minutes were wonderful. If only the emphasis had been on action throughout the film would have been a hit. Unfortunately it wasn't. Still, with the pre-sales I'd made we didn't lose nearly as much as we might have". David Niven Jr said "we had a lot of fun on that picture, I just wish it had been more successful."

According to a number of sources, this film's motorcycle chase scene is, as one critic said, "one of the most memorable motorcycle chase scenes in cinematic history".

Another says: "Film is an uneven mix of comedy and military action, but includes a stand out motorcycle chase. During a battle with the resistance, SS Major Volkmann escapes on a motorcycle with Charlie (played by Elliott Gould) chasing after him on a motorcycle with sidecar down narrow village streets. Impressive motorcycle stuntwork featuring some excellent jumps". Author Mark Hinchliff of Motorbike Writer ranks the chase in Escape to Athena as 3rd, only after those in The Great Escape (1st) and Skyfall (2nd).

See also
Kelly's Heroes (1970)
Inside Out (1975)

References

External links
 
 
 
 

1970s adventure films
1970s war films
1979 films
British war films
Films about Greek resistance
Films directed by George P. Cosmatos
Films set in 1944
Films set in Axis-occupied Greece
Films set on islands
ITC Entertainment films
War adventure films
World War II films based on actual events
World War II prisoner of war films
Films shot in Greece
Films shot in Rhodes
Films scored by Lalo Schifrin
Films with screenplays by Edward Anhalt
1970s English-language films
1970s British films